Southwest Papua is a province of Indonesia, and is a fraction of Western New Guinea. Despite being named southwest, it is a misnomer and this province is actually located in the northwest edge of Papua. ("Barat Daya", or Far West, also refers to the sun on the summer solstice when it sets in the southwest.) The area that belongs to this province includes the Greater Sorong area which consists of Sorong City, Sorong Regency, South Sorong Regency, Maybrat Regency, Tambrauw Regency, and Raja Ampat Regency. The Draft Law (RUU) on the Establishment of the Southwest Papua Province has been passed into law and becomes the 38th province in Indonesia.

Southwest Papua is located at the northwestern tip of an area called the Doberai Peninsula or the Bird's Head Peninsula. The westernmost tip of this province is the Raja Ampat Regency Regional Marine Protected Area whose beauty is worldwide and has a high diversity of marine life such as coral reefs, giant turtles, manta rays to whale sharks so that it is called a diver's paradise. Raja Ampat Islands consists of various islands such as Batanta, Misool, Salawati, and Waigeo. The capital of Southwest Papua is Sorong which is known as an oil and gas producer and an entry hub to Papua with complete port and airport facilities which makes it one of the most developed cities in Papua. In this province there are many ecosystems such as tropical rainforests and mountains that are still preserved. Tambrauw Regency which is a well known birdwatching destination, declared its area as a Conservation District to increase ecotourism.

History

Sultanate of Tidore period 
The Raja Ampat Islands in Southwest Papua is a territory known since ancient times for having its own traditional government. These areas are traditionally governed by indigenous landowners called Jaja, before the migration of ethnic Ma'ya kings from Waigeo with the title Fun and was further influenced by the Sultanate of Bacan and the Sultanate of Tidore with the taking of Moluccan title of Kolano as part of the expansion the territory of the sultanate under Gurabesi with the appointment of four kings called Kalano Muraha or Korano Ngaruha or Raja Ampat in Indonesian or Malay. The 'four kings', in some version descendants of Gurabesi, originated in Waigeo were appointed as administrator for the scattered group of islands and some coastal regions in Tanah Besar (mainland Papua). These were the three brothers, Fun Giwar the ancestor of kings in Waigeo, Fun Malaban the ancestor of kings in Salawati, Fun Bis the ancestor of kings in Lilinta (Misool). Later on, Tidore appointed another king in Misool, Tuimadahe, who was the ancestor of kings in Waigama, his descendants merged with native Matbat 'jaja' line. Lastly Fun Mo was an unrelated Moi from Tanah Besar, the ancestor of kings in Sailolof, and later married the daughter of a king from Waigeo.

Colonial period 

The Tidore Sultanate became Dutch protectorate in the 17th century. During the Dutch East Indies era, Papua was considered to have little economic value compared to other islands, so it was left to the Tidore Sultanate to govern and tax. However by the late 19th century, the Dutch Government realized that colonization of Papua could prevent other Europeans from approaching other islands in the Dutch East Indies which disrupted their trade monopoly especially spices in the Maluku Islands hence the territory was governed more directly. Until the end of the 19th century the main commodities in Papua were slaves and bird of paradise feathers. At the beginning of the 20th century, Europeans began to find signs of mineral potential in Papua. In 1935, Nederlandsch Nieuw Guinee Petroleum Maatschappij (NNGPM) established to conduct oil and gas exploration. Oil was found in various places, in Klamono and the Sele Strait (the strait between Papua Island and Salawati Island), both in the Sorong Regency.

 
At the beginning of the 20th century, the Dutch divided New Guinea into several parts of afdeeling. One of which is Afdeeling Noord Nieuw Guinea (North New Guinea) based in Manokwari. Afdeeling is divided into several onderafdeeling, One of which is Sorong onderafdeeling centered on Doom Island. The Dutch then built offices, churches and settlements and arranged cities on this island so that it became a trading center and port. Residents who lived at that time told how Doom Island was brightly lit at night even though Sorong was still pitch black.

Papua was occupied by the Japanese in 1942. This area became an area of battle in World War II. The allied troops under General Douglas MacArthur implemented the island hopping strategy by breaking the Japanese logistics chain. Allied troops one by one controlled the north coast of Papua starting from Jayapura, Biak, and to the next islands ending in Sausapor, in Tambrauw Regency. The Allies sent spies to find a suitable place to land and then Sausapor beach was chosen. The weakly defended Sausapor was captured by the allied forces in Operation Globetrotter between July and August 1944. An airstrip was then built at Sausapor so that it became the allied base for attacking the Moluccas and the Philippines. Japanese forces in Manokwari and Sorong who were cut off from other units fled to the forest and hid until the war was over. The Sausapor operation marked Papua's liberation from Japan. Sausapor now has many remnants of the war.

Post colonial 
This region become the site of confrontations during Operation Trikora due to its proximity to Indonesian territory in the Maluku Islands. The first incursion into the Raja Ampat islands was an attempt by PG 200 on 14 September 1961 with 39 men under Lieutenant Jamaluddin Nasution. Lieutenant Nasution and two Papuans, Gerson Esuru (from Warwasi Village, Arguni) and Wos Rumaserang (both from the Gerakan Pelarian Pemuda) died in this attempt. This was then followed by PG 300, with command company 191261 under lt. Managing to infiltrate Gag Island, with 29 local islander joining the company. While command company 191260 under Serma Boy Thomas managed to reach Cape Dalpele in Waigeo Island after hiding in Bala-Bala Island. These efforts were followed by other infiltration of PG 400 (survivor of KRI Macan Tutul) led by Charles Papilaya and PG 500 led former Permesta rebel by Jonkey Robert Kumontoy and managed to join with Herlina Kasim and also PG 200 who had arrived earlier. The island of Waigeo was a safe haven for Indonesian troops as Dutch forces rarely patroled the region. While in Sorong, Simon Randa, a Torajan, with the Moi tribes supplied Indonesian guerilla forces called enso-enso  in the Moi language. 

The dispute ended with the signing of New York Agreement and Western New Guinea was put under UNTEA until 1963 where it was ceded to Indonesia. In 1969, a controversial plebiscite called the Act of free choice or PEPERA  was held where West Irian formally became Indonesian territory. In 1969, the Government began to draw up administrative divisions in this area. The former Sorong onderafdeeling was changed to Sorong Regency, which has an area similar to the present Southwest Papua Province. The island of Doom, which has limited land, was abandoned, while the city of Sorong, on the mainland of Papua Island, has gradually become more crowded and densely populated because of its strategic location. Doom Island is now the capital of the Sorong Islands district, with some of the old buildings being restored to become government offices. The population in Sorong has also increased with the opening of the transmigration program by the government. Because of Sorong's rapid growth, the local government proposed an increase in the status of Sorong to become an Administrative City which was approved by the Ministry of Home Affairs in 1996.

On 4 October 1999, Sorong City was formalized by law and separated from Sorong Regency. The existence of regional autonomy has caused rapid expansion in the number of regencies and districts. Sorong Regency has become smaller in size due to this regional division. On 11 December 2002 South Sorong Regency and Raja Ampat Regency were created from parts of Sorong Regency, then in 2008 Tambrauw Regency (on 29 October) and Maybrat Regency (on 19 December) were created from other parts of Sorong Regency. The support for the creation of a new province was due to dispute on the location of West Papua's provincial capital between Sorong and Manokwari. Manokwari faction argues that Manokwari is a mnukwar (old village), because it was the location of the original Dutch residents. After the decision to pick Manokwari, John Piet Wanane, the Regent of Sorong, began to coordinate efforts to create a new province for the former Sorong Regency, called Sorong Raya, which is based according to the ethnic groups that exist in the region. What was then the whole of the former Sorong Regency was later formalized in law to become Southwest Papua Province in 2022 after 20 years of advocacy. 

Expansion in this area was marred by many controversies. In Maybrat Regency, there was a debate over the location of the district capital, between Kumurkek and Ayamaru. Kumurkek is supported by the people of Aifat while Ayamaru is supported by the people of Ayamaru and Aitinyo. This struggle for the capital took place until the Constitutional Court decided that the capital was Ayamaru in 2013. Community divisions still occurred, so a meeting was held between the communities and it was finally agreed that the capital would be in Kumurkek in 2019. After the transfer of the capital, the Ayamaru people planed to separate themselves by forming the Maybrat Sau Regency. Another controversy is the district loan problem that occurred in Tambrauw Regency. After it was formed, Tambrauw Regency, which was split from Sorong, "borrowed" 4 districts belonging to Manokwari Regency based on political agreement with the purpose of local election. The Constitutional Court rejected the appeal and confirmed the move of the now 11 districts in 2013 which led to protests from the community. The people of Kebar, Amberbaken, Mubrani, and Senopi who felt they had been forcibly moved to Tambrauw demanded to be declared a new West Manokwari Regency. With the division of Southwest Papua, the community requested that West Manokwari be removed from this new province because it tends to be closer in distance and custom to Manokwari than Sorong and is the customary territory of the Arfak tribe. However, this did not materialize until the new province was formed and should be addressed in a separate law regarding Tambrauw and Manokwari.

Southwest Papua was passed into law on 17 November 2022 by the DPR and inaugurated on 9 December 2022 by the Ministry of Home Affairs. On the day of the inauguration, Muhammad Musa'ad was also appointed as acting governor.

Geography

Mountains 
 Mount Kwoka in Tambrauw Regency
 Tamarau Mountains in Tambrauw Regency

Lakes 
 Lake Framu in Maybrat Regency
 Lake Uter in Maybrat Regency
 Lake Framu In Maybrat Regency

Rivers 

 Kohoin River in South Sorong Regency
 Kais River in South Sorong Regency
 Panta Kapal River in South Sorong Regency
 Warswai River in Tambrauw
 Wowei River in Tambrauw

Administration 
	
	
The new province, when created, will consist of five regencies plus the autonomous City of Sorong, which has the same status as a regency. The areas and populations as at the 2010 and 2020 Censuses, together with the official estimates as at mid 2021, are tabulated below:

Demographics

Religion
The majority of the population of Southwest Papua are Protestant. According to data Directorate General of Population and Civil Registration, 61.65% of the population is Christian, with 54.5% adhering to Protestantism and 7.16% adhering to Catholicism, Islam is followed by 38.14% of the population, 0.1% adheres to Hinduism and another 0.1% Buddhism.

Ethnic groups

Southwest Papua has diversity in ethnic groups in the area. Southwest Papua itself is included in the Doberai or Domberai customary territory which consists of 52 ethnic groups. For example Moi people or Malamoi who are one of the original inhabitants of the Sorong City and regency and Maybrat people with various sub-ethnic such as Ayamaru, Aitinyo, and Aifat who come from Maybrat and South Sorong Regencies. Many famous figures come from the Ayamaru people, such as Indonesian footballers Boaz Solossa and Ricky Kambuaya. The other ethnic groups are the coastal Ma'ya, the ethnicity of the 'Four Kings' and the migrants Beser from Biak Islands and indigenous groups like Matbat and Amber living in the inland of Raja Ampat islands. Abun, Miyah and Mpur in Tambrauw regency; Tehit in Teminabuan; and Kokoda from Sorong, the majority of whom are Muslims.

Languages 
The people of Southwest Papua also have a variety of regional languages, Papuan Malay is lingua franca in this area. Based on language map data published Language Development and Fostering Agency, Ministry of Education, Culture, Research, and Technology, there are at least 46 regional languages ​​spoken by the people of Southwest Papua Province. In Sorong City, there is Yamueti. In Maybrat Regency, there are Ayamaru, Kambran, Maisomara, and Pokoro. In Raja Ampat Regency, there are Ambel language, Batanta, Beser, Beser-Swaimbon, Gebe, Matbat, Matlow, Ma'ya, Ma'ya Legenyan-Kawei, Salafen Matbat, Samate, Selegof, Tepin, and Wardo. In Sorong Regency, there are languages As, Efpan, Esaro, Kalabra, Moi Sigin, Moraid, Palamul, Seget, and Waliam. In South Sorong Regency, there are Awe, Fkour, Imiyan, Kais, Kokoda, Salkma, Tehit, Tehit Dit, Yaben, and Yahadian-Mugim. In Tambrauw Regency, there are Abun, Abun Gii, Abun Ji, Irires, Karon, Mpur, and Mpur Pantai.

Education

Pendidikan Tinggi 
The province has many universities, both public and private, among others:

State and Official 

 University of Papua (UNIPA)
 Campus II Sorong- Faculty of Medicine
 Campus III Raja Ampat - D3 Ecotourism Study Programme
 Sausapor Tambrauw Campus - D3 Forest Resources Conservation Study Programme
 Sorong State Islamic Institute (IAIN Sorong)
 Health Polytechnic of the Ministry of Health Sorong (Poltekkes Kemenkes Sorong)
 Sorong Shipping Polytechnic (Poltekpel Sorong)
 Sorong Marine and Fisheries Polytechnic

Private 

 Universitas Muhammadiyah Sorong (UNAMIN) - formerly Al-Amin University
 University of Education Muhammadiyah Sorong (UNIMUDA)
 University of Victory Sorong (UNVIC)
 Papua Christian University (UKIP)
 Saint Paul Catholic Polytechnic Sorong

Secondary School 
Southwest Papua has a leading school, SMA Averos Kota Sorong. According to the College Entrance Test Institute (LTMPT), the school ranked highest among all schools in Papua Island based on the Computer-Based Written Examination in 2022. Even in that year there were only two schools from Papua ranked in the top 1000 with SMA Averos ranked 570 out of all schools across Indonesia.

Tourism

Raja Ampat Islands

The Raja Ampat Islands are a series of four adjacent island clusters located in the western part of the Bird's Head (Vogelkoop) of Papua Island. Administratively, this cluster is under Raja Ampat Regency, Southwest Papua Province. These islands are now a destination for divers who are interested in the beauty of the underwater scenery. The island group is named after the four kings, who used to rule the islands of Waigeo, Misool, Salawati, and Batanta.

Tambraw Conservation Regency 

The Regent of Tambrauw declared Tambrauw Regency as a Conservation Regency through a Regional Regulation in 2018. Most of Tambrauw's territory consists of conservation forests, protected forests, and coastal areas with a variety of protected flora and fauna. Indigenous people with their traditional culture play an important role in maintaining the conservation area. Some protected areas in Tambrauw include North Tambrauw Nature Reserve, South Tambrauw Nature Reserve, Sausapor Beach Nature Reserve, and Jeen Womom Coastal Park. Because of its beautiful and well-preserved nature, Tambrauw has great ecotourism potential. One of them is as a birdwatching destination. Birds that can be found in Tambrauw include cenderawasih, mambruk, cockatoo, nuri and cassowary. Other fauna in Tambrauw include wallabies, tree kangaroos, cuscuses and leatherback turtles.

Culture

References 

 
Provinces of Indonesia
Autonomous provinces
2022 establishments in Indonesia
States and territories established in 2022